Heroes of Might and Magic II: The Succession Wars  is a turn-based strategy video game developed by Jon Van Caneghem through New World Computing and published in 1996 by the 3DO Company. The game is the second installment of the Heroes of Might and Magic series and is typically credited as the breakout game for the series. Heroes II was voted the sixth-best PC game of all time by PC Gamer in May 1997.

An expansion pack, The Price of Loyalty, was released in 1997. Later, 3DO bundled Heroes II and its expansion pack in one box, released as Heroes of Might and Magic II Gold in 1998.

Gameplay

For the most part, Heroes of Might and Magic II is largely a graphical overhaul to the first game. Gameplay in both games is along the 4X genre of strategy games, in that the player builds their kingdom from the ground up, securing resources, stronger armies, better generals, and then uses those assets to find and defeat opponents through capturing their castles and defeating their armies. Aside from the updated look, Heroes II added many new features that would become staples in the Heroes of Might and Magic franchise. Heroes II added the Necromancer and Wizard factions, joining the original four factions (Knight, Barbarian, Sorceress, and Warlock) from the first game. These two new factions also come with an army of creatures and a themed town that ties the faction together, and the six are divided down the middle to have 3 "good" and 3 "evil" factions.

Each hero still retains the 'primary skill' system from Heroes I but now can also learn secondary skills, giving each hero the ability to become more distinctive as they gain experience. Each hero can possess up to eight different secondary skills and once gained, a skill can be developed from Basic to Advanced and Expert levels. For example, the Wisdom skill allows a hero to learn spells of level 3 and higher, while the Logistics skill increases the hero's movement ability over land. In Heroes I, heroes had a single, fixed special ability according to their class. The magic system was overhauled in Heroes II. Heroes I had used a memorization system in which each spell could be cast a certain number of times before being exhausted, where the player had to return to a guild to relearn the spell. Heroes II uses a magic point system that allows the player to apportion spell use as needed, while the varying point cost of different spells maintains balance. Another major feature introduced in Heroes II is the ability to upgrade certain army units, granting them improved statistics and, in some cases, important abilities.

In order to play, players guide around their heroes and have them fight other ones and castles. People have full control over their castles, what to build in them, and whether to upgrade a town to a castle. People can only upgrade each castle once per turn.

Lastly, Heroes II added more scenarios to the game and a proper campaign, where the player chooses the good or evil side and plays a series of scenarios using the three factions of that side. Victories in certain scenarios give the player lasting bonuses that carry over to future scenarios, and the player can choose a starting bonus before each scenario starts based on what strategy they take.

Story
The canonical ending of Heroes I results in Lord Morglin Ironfist's victory. In the following years, he has successfully unified the continent of Enroth and secured his rule as king. Upon the king's death, his two sons, Archibald and Roland, vie for the crown. Archibald orchestrates a series of events that lead to Roland's exile. Archibald is then declared the new king, while Roland organizes a resistance. Each alignment is represented by one of the game's two campaigns. Archibald's campaign features the three "evil" town alignments, while Roland's campaign features the three "good" town alignments.

If Archibald is victorious, Roland's rebellion is crushed, and Roland himself is imprisoned in Castle Ironfist, leaving Archibald the uncontested ruler of Enroth. The canonical ending, however, results in Roland's victory, with Archibald being turned to stone by Roland's court wizard, Tanir. This event is referenced later in Might and Magic VI: The Mandate of Heaven, when Archibald is freed of the spell. He goes on to be a significant NPC in Might and Magic VII: For Blood and Honor.

Development

Much of the core programming of Heroes II was carried over from the original Heroes, thus the game actually took less time to develop than the original Heroes.

The soundtrack was produced primarily by Paul Romero.

Reception 

In December 1996, PC Gamer reported that Heroes of Might and Magic II was "doing particularly well in retail, with every 3DO retailer reordering the product." Combined sales of the Heroes of Might and Magic series, including Heroes II, surpassed 500,000 copies by October 1997. This number rose to 1.5 million copies by December 1999.

Next Generation reviewed the Macintosh version of the game, rating it three stars out of five, and stated that "as role-playing games are few on the Mac, HM&MII, with its mix of character and Warcraft-like game elements is a welcome addition."

Computer Gaming World called Heroes II a "strategy game that amaze[d] everyone with its surprising, addictive qualities and amazing ease of use" and found that Heroes II was "much better than the original Heroes of Might and Magic." Apart from two gameplay issues - the lack of a wait function, and not being able to control your hero if all of your units are disabled, the reviewer found the game "nearly perfect."

The editors of PC Gamer US named Heroes of Might and Magic II 1996's "Best Turn-Based Strategy Game", and called it "clearly a cut above" the rest of its genre that year. The game was nominated for Computer Gaming Worlds 1996 "Strategy Game of the Year" and Computer Game Entertainments "Best Strategy Game" prizes, as well as Computer Games Strategy Pluss award for the top turn-based strategy title of 1996, but lost in all of these categories to Civilization II. It was also a finalist for the Computer Game Developers Conference's 1996 "Best Strategy/War Game" Spotlight Award, which ultimately went to Command & Conquer: Red Alert. The editors of Computer Gaming World wrote, "The simplicity of King's Bounty-style tactical combat is the perfect counterpoint to the surprising depth of the strategic game, and unlike Heroes I, the campaign is much more satisfying."

Legacy
Heroes of Might and Magic II was named the 25th-best computer game ever by PC Gamer UK in 1997. In 1998, PC Gamer US declared it the seventh-best computer game ever released, and the editors called it "the most dangerously addictive turn-based strategy game in the history of PC gaming (with the possible exception of Civilization II)." In 2003, Heroes of Might and Magic II was inducted into GameSpot's list of the greatest games of all time.

Expansion

The Price of Loyalty is the expansion pack for Heroes II, released on May 16, 1997. The expansion adds four new campaigns, new artifacts, new scenario maps, new in-map buildings and an improved map editor. The expansion also added a new structure for the necromancer faction - the shrine that enhances the heroes' ability to raise the dead (Necromancy Skills). Each new campaign had a totally different story that does not have any connection to the original game or the other campaigns.

References

1996 video games
Acorn Archimedes games
DOS games
Game Boy Color games
Games commercially released with DOSBox
Heroes of Might and Magic
Classic Mac OS games
New World Computing games
The 3DO Company games
Video games developed in the United States
Video games scored by Paul Romero
Video games scored by Steve Baca
Video games set in castles
Video games with expansion packs
Windows games
Multiplayer and single-player video games
19. ^ Heroes of the Might and Magic II demo game (ENG)